It Ain't Me Babe is a song by Bob Dylan

The title may also refer to:

It Ain't Me Babe (album), album by The Turtles
It Ain't Me Babe, album by The Surfaris
It Ain't Me, Babe (comics), the first comic book produced entirely by women
It Ain't Me, Babe (newspaper) a 1970s feminist newspaper in Berkeley, California